Christine Anne Jardine (born 24 November 1960) is a Scottish Liberal Democrat politician serving as the Liberal Democrat Spokesperson for Women and Equalities, the Cabinet Office and Scotland since July 2022. She was elected as the Member of Parliament (MP) for Edinburgh West in 2017.

She previously served as Liberal Democrat Spokesperson for Treasury, Europe, Exiting the European Union and International Trade from 2020 to 2022. She was the Liberal Democrat Home Affairs Spokesperson from 2019 to 2020.

Education and early career
Jardine was educated at Braidfield High School and the University of Glasgow, where she graduated with a MA (Hons).

She is a former journalist, who worked for BBC Scotland and was editor of the Press Association in Scotland. She also taught journalism at the University of Strathclyde, Robert Gordon University and the University of the West of Scotland.

In 2011 Jardine was appointed Scotland media adviser to the Coalition Government, working under Nick Clegg. That same year, she was the Lib Dem candidate for Inverness and Nairn at the 2011 Scottish Parliament election, where she finished fourth. In May 2013, she was selected as the candidate for the upcoming by-election in Aberdeen Donside, this time coming third. In 2015, she lost to Alex Salmond in the election for the Westminster constituency of Gordon.

Jardine is a Vice-Chair of the All-Party Parliamentary Group for Choice at the End of Life.

Political career
She was elected for the Edinburgh West constituency in the 2017 general election, succeeding independent MP Michelle Thomson who had been elected as a member of the SNP. Jardine received 18,108 votes and 34.4% of the overall vote. She served as the Liberal Democrat Spokesperson on Home Affairs and Women and Equalities from August 2019 to August 2020, and was also the Justice Spokesperson from August 2019 to October 2019. and sits on the Scottish Affairs Committee at Westminster.

Jardine retained her seat at the 2019 general election and increased her majority from 2,988 (5.7%) to 3,769 (6.9%).

She was promoted to trade, treasury and Brexit spokeswoman in September 2020.

On 11 July 2022, Jardine was appointed Liberal Democrat Spokesperson for Women and Equalities, Liberal Democrat Spokesperson for the Cabinet Office and Liberal Democrat Spokesperson for Scotland.

Personal life
Jardine was married for 30 years to Calum Macdonald, the Digital Editor for the Herald and Times Group. He died of a heart attack aged 55 during the 2017 General Election campaign. 

She has one daughter.

References

External links

 Appearances on C-SPAN

All-Party Parliamentary Group for Choice at the End of Life

Living people
Scottish Liberal Democrat MPs
UK MPs 2017–2019
UK MPs 2019–present
Female members of the Parliament of the United Kingdom for Scottish constituencies
Members of the Parliament of the United Kingdom for Edinburgh constituencies
Scottish journalists
Scottish women journalists
21st-century Scottish women politicians
21st-century Scottish politicians
1960 births
People educated at Braidfield High School
Politicians from Glasgow
21st-century British women politicians